Kadikkad  is a village in Thrissur district in the state of Kerala, India. It is situated in Punnayurkulam panchayat, near its border with Malappuram district, 12 km north of the temple town Guruvayoor and 15 km south of Ponnani.

Demographics
 India census, Kadikkad had a population of 16815 with 7736 males and 9079 females.

References

Villages in Thrissur district